Stanley J. Lato (November 2, 1924 – April 10, 2002) was an American dairy farmer and politician.

Lato was born on November 2, 1924, in Thorp, Wisconsin. He graduated from Thorp High School. During World War II, Lato served in the United States Navy. Lato owned a dairy farm near Gilman WI. He was a member of the American Legion and the Veterans of Foreign Wars, as well as the Knights of Columbus. Lato died on April 10, 2002, in Stanley, Wisconsin.

Political career
Lato was elected to the Wisconsin State Assembly in 1974 and 1976. Previously, he was chairman and Supervisor of Gilman, Taylor County, Wisconsin and Supervisor of Taylor County, Wisconsin from 1970 to 1972. He was a Democrat.

Lato introduced legislation to "encourage the consumption of Wisconsin cheese by designing an official logotype to serve as a recognizable identification mark appropriate for affixation to and display in connection with cheese produced in this state." The design for the cheese was the outline of the state of Wisconsin with the words "100% Wisconsin Cheese" and other specifications as deemed appropriate by the department of Commerce.

While serving he had committee assignments that included:
 1975—Agriculture, Commerce and Consumer Affairs;Commerce & Consumer Affairs Com and its Subcom. on Costs of Retail Food Production; Health and Social Services; Tourism. Retail Food Production
 1977—Agriculture, Commerce and Consumer Affairs; Revisions; State Affairs;

References

People from Thorp, Wisconsin
People from Taylor County, Wisconsin
Mayors of places in Wisconsin
County supervisors in Wisconsin
Democratic Party members of the Wisconsin State Assembly
Military personnel from Wisconsin
United States Navy sailors
United States Navy personnel of World War II
1924 births
2002 deaths
20th-century American politicians